Adri (de Jongh) Schoeman (born 13 July 1970) is a retired South African sprinter who specialized in the 400 metres.

She competed in both 200 and 400 metres at the 1994 Commonwealth Games without reaching the final, and also in 400 metres at the 1997 World Championships without even finishing the race. At the 2004 African Championships she won silver medals in both 4 × 100 metres relay and 4 × 400 metres relay, the latter in a South African record, and at the 2006 Commonwealth Games she competed in the 400 metres and the 4 × 400 metres relay.

Her personal best time was 51.70 seconds, achieved in April 1997 in Pretoria.

References

External links 
 

1970 births
Living people
South African female sprinters
Athletes (track and field) at the 1994 Commonwealth Games
Athletes (track and field) at the 2006 Commonwealth Games
Commonwealth Games competitors for South Africa
20th-century South African women
21st-century South African women